Heian-kyō  was one of several former names for the city now known as Kyoto. It was the official capital of Japan for over one thousand years, from 794 to 1868 with an interruption in 1180.

Emperor Kanmu established it as the capital in 794, moving the Imperial Court there from nearby Nagaoka-kyō at the recommendation of his advisor Wake no Kiyomaro and marking the beginning of the Heian period of Japanese history. According to  modern scholarship, the  city is thought to  have been modelled after the urban planning  for the Tang dynasty Chinese capital of Chang'an (modern-day Xi'an). It remained the chief political center until 1185, when the samurai Minamoto clan defeated the Taira clan in the Genpei War, moving administration of national affairs to Kamakura and establishing the Kamakura shogunate.

Though political power would be wielded by the samurai class over the course of three different shogunates, Heian remained the site of the Imperial Court and seat of Imperial power, and thus remained the official capital. In fact, even after the seat of Imperial power was moved to Tokyo in 1868, since there is no law which makes Tokyo the capital, there is a view that Kyoto legally or officially remains the capital even today.

In 1994, Kyoto City held various events commemorating its 1200th anniversary.

Description 

The city boundaries formed a rectangle measuring 4.5 km from east to west and 5.2 km from north to south. The city layout followed Heijō-kyō (Japan's capital during the Nara period) with the Imperial palace, Daidairi, placed in the center of the northern city limits and the Suzaku Avenue (Suzaku-ōji), the main thoroughfare extending from the palace down through the center of the city, dividing it into the Right (Ukyō) and Left Capitals (Sakyō) (the eastern side being the Left and the western side being the Right from the emperor's viewpoint.) The design followed Sui and Tang dynasty Changan with the exception that Heian-kyō had no city walls. It is thought that the site for the city was selected according to the principles of  based on Chinese Feng shui and relating to the Four Symbols of Chinese astrology.

The location of Nishi-kyōgoku-ōji at the western limit is estimated as a line running north to south from Hanazono Station on the JR San'in Main Line to Nishi-Kyōgoku Station on the Hankyu Kyoto Line.

The city was further divided by major streets called  and minor streets called . In this way addresses could be identified as follows: "Right Capital, Jō Five, Bō Two, Chō Fourteen" .

The width of even the minor streets was 4 Jō  and for the major streets over 8 Jō . Almost all of the streets in present-day Kyoto have become considerably narrower.

History 

In 784 AD emperor Kammu constructed Nagaoka-kyō, moving the capital from Heijō-kyō. It is thought that he wished to build a new, Emperor Tenji faction capital far from Yamato Province which was the power base for the temples and aristocrats who supported the Emperor Tenmu faction. However, only 9 years later in January 793 AD, Emperor Kammu assembled his retainers and announced another relocation of the capital (for the reason see the entry on Nagaoka-kyō.) The location for the new capital was to be Kadono located between two rivers in the north of Yamashiro, ten kilometers to the northeast of Nagaoka-kyō. It is said that the Emperor Kammu had previously looked out on Kadono from the Shōgun Tsuka in Higashiyama Ward of Kyoto City, deciding then that it was a suitable location for the capital. Emperor Kammu's words are recorded in the Nihon Kiryaku as follows: "Kadono has beautiful mountains and rivers as well as good transport links by sea and land making it convenient for people to assemble there from all four corners of the country."

It is thought that the construction of Heian-kyō began from the palace, with the construction of the remainder of the city following afterwards. As a display of the emperor's authority the Daigokuden (main building of the palace) was constructed at the far north of the central thoroughfare, Suzaku-oji, making the building visible from anywhere in the city. These ports acted as a transit base for collecting in goods from all over the country and for forwarding them on to the city. The goods which arrived in Heian-kyō reached the people by way of one of the two large markets (the East market and the West market.) This arrangement provided a stable supply of food and goods which encouraged population growth. Measures were also taken to guard against the flooding which had plagued the residents of Nagaoka-kyō. Although there was no natural river in the center of Heian-kyō, two artificial canals (the present day Horikawa and Nishi Horikawa) were dug whose water level could be adjusted, simultaneously securing a supply of water and guarding against flooding. It was also permitted to construct Buddhist temples in Heian-kyō, something which had been forbidden in Nagaoka-kyō. It was thought that the power of the East and West temples might protect the city from natural disaster and disease, and priests such as Kūkai were welcomed, being able men, well versed in Buddhist scripture and with no interest in political power. On 22 October 794 AD, Emperor Kammu arrived at the new city and on 8 November proclaimed, "I hereby name this city Heian-kyō."

A movement in favor of returning the capital to Heijō-kyō arose in 810 AD, during a standoff over the emperor's succession. However, Emperor Saga thought that keeping the capital in Heian-kyō would be best for the stability of the country and resisted this movement, naming Heian-kyō .

The land of the Right Capital overlapped the wetlands formed by the Katsura River and even by the 9th century little progress had been made in developing the area. By the 10th century when the Ritsuryō system was almost at an end, the district had become so dilapidated that it began to be used as farmland, something which had previously been forbidden within the city limits. With the exception of an area in the north of the Right Capital near to the palace, the residential areas which housed the aristocracy were all situated in the Left Capital, with the highest echelon of aristocrats such as the Fujiwara clan gathering in the northernmost part of the district. The poor of Heian-kyō began to set up home by the Kamo River, beyond the eastern limits of the city, and on the eastern banks of the river temples and country homes sprung up. So started a tendency for the city to extend out to the east. In 980 AD, at the southern tip of Suzaku-oji the Rajōmon (the grandest of the two city gates) collapsed never to be rebuilt. In this way the original borders of Heian-kyō extended out to the east, forming the streets of first medieval and then modern-day Kyoto.

With the advent of the Kanto centered Kamakura and Edo shogunates, Heian-kyō began to lose its significance as a seat of power. The greatest decline was during the Muromachi and Sengoku periods when almost half the city was burnt to the ground during the Ōnin war. After this Heian-kyō separated into upper (Kamigyō) and lower (Shimogyō) cities each becoming places of little note. However, the two were to be reunited into one city during the Azuchi–Momoyama period following the ascension of Oda Nobunaga. During the Meiji Revolution, Edo was re-christened Tokyo (becoming the new capital of Japan). Although Heian-kyō lost its status as capital city, it became a backup capital while the emperor was away in Tokyo. Since that time the emperor has not returned to Kyoto. However, at the direction of the Emperor Meiji, the imperial residences have been preserved and the —a special throne whose location traditionally marked the seat of the emperor—remains at the palace in Kyoto.

Schematic diagram of Heian-kyō 
The green areas in the diagram are markets, temples and a garden. There were two large markets, West Market  and East Market , facing the seventh street, Shichijō-ōji . Tō-ji  and Sai-ji  were Buddhist temples built on the southern edge of the capital. An imperial garden called Shinsenen  was adjacent to the Daidairi.

Note that there were more paths cut short by residences straddling multiple blocks.

In English (major streets and palace only):
Note: "" erroneously listed twice in the diagram.

Gates 
The gates of the Daidairi are marked in Japanese Kanji in the above grid, below are the romanization of said gate names alongside the kanji:

Map

Below is a 1696 map of Kyoto, known as Genroku 9 Kyoto Daizu held by the International Research Center for Japanese Studies (Nichibunken).

See also

Heian Palace
Chiteiki, a mid-Heian period text describing social issues within the capital
Timeline of Kyoto
Cosmology of Kyoto, a visual novel interactive computer game for Windows 3.1 set in 900 AD Heian-kyō

References

794 establishments
8th-century establishments in Japan
Former capitals of Japan
History of Kyoto
Planned capitals
Populated places established in the 8th century
History of Kyoto Prefecture
Emperor Kanmu
Heian period